The Nyakahita–Kazo–Kamwenge–Fort Portal Road is a road in the Western Region of Uganda, connecting the towns of Nyakahita and Kazo in Kiruhura District, Ibanda in Ibanda District, Kamwenge in Kamwenge District, and Fort Portal in Kabarole District.

Location
The coordinates of the road near Kamwenge are 0°11'09.0"N, 30°27'14.0"E (Latitude:0.185833; Longitude:30.453889).

Upgrading to bitumen

Before 2011, the entire road was poor grade gravel surface. In that year, the upgrading of the road to bitumen was divided into three sections: Nyakahita–Kazo , Kazo–Kamwenge , and Kamwenge–Fort Portal .

The Nyakahita–Kazo section was contracted to the China Communications Construction Company for USh:134 billion. The consulting engineers on the project were J. Burrow. This section was completed in June 2013. The Kazo–Kamwenge section was contracted to the China Railway Seventh Group for USh:167 billion. The Canadian engineering firm SNC Lavalin performed the consulting and supervision. Construction on these two sections began in May 2011. Funding was sourced from the African Development Bank and the Ugandan government. Work on the Kazo–Kamwenge Road ended in June 2014.

Work to upgrade the  Kamwenge–Fort Portal section was assigned to the China Railway Seventh Group. The USh:120 billion cost is funded jointly by the government of Uganda and the International Development Association. Work began in February 2015, and is expected to end in July 2016. In August 2017, the Daily Monitor, a Ugandan English language daily, reported that this section of the road had been completed.

See also
 List of roads in Uganda
 Economy of Uganda
 Transport in Uganda

References

External links
 Uganda National Road Authority Homepage
 Regional Imbalance: The Story of Road Construction In Uganda

 

Roads in Uganda
Kabarole District
Kamwenge District
Ibanda District
Kiruhura District
Toro sub-region
Ankole sub-region